Imogen Cotter (born 5 July 1993) is an Irish professional racing cyclist who currently rides for Plantur Pura UCI Women's Continental Team . In October 2020, she rode in the 2020 Tour of Flanders for Women's race in Belgium.

In January 2022 she was injured in Spain while training. She suffered a ruptured quadriceps tendon, a broken patella, radius and ulna after being hit by a car driving on the wrong side of the road.

References

External links
 

1993 births
Living people
Irish female cyclists
Place of birth missing (living people)